Big Brother Angola 2, also known as Big Brother: Duplo Impacto, is the second season of the Angolan version of the Big Brother reality television franchise produced by Endemol for DStv. The season began on 31 May 2015 The show is hosted by Dicla Burity for the second time.

Housemates

Twists

Pairs 
The launch was divided in two nights, May 31 and June 1. In each, a housemate had to choose another housemate to be his/her pair. The pairs of Day 1 were:
 Suraya & Ananias
 Filipe & Alicelma
 Rossana & Timino
 Cremilda & Kissamá
 Luna & Aníbal

The pairs of Day 2 were:
 Samupafo & Petra
 Neury & Dionísio
 Mr. Norway & Marinela
 Fanto+ & Li.G

However, between the next 2 weeks housemates could swap pairs. At the end of Week 2, the pairs were definitive, and were the follow:
 Alicelma & Fanto+
 Ananias & Rossana
 Aníbal & Marinela
 Cremilda & Filipe
 Dionísio & Petra
 Kissamá & Neury
 Li.G & Timino
 Luna & Mr Norway
 Samupafo & Suraya

Nomination History 
Nominations were similar to Big Brother Mzansi 2015.

Notes
 The nominations were divided into two rounds: the first one was on Sunday, in which each housemate nominated a pair and the second one was on Monday, in which each pair nominated another pair. The results were added, and Luna & Mr. Norway, Dionísio & Petra, Ananias & Rossana and Kissamá & Neury were the initial nominees. Then Cremilda & Filipe won the Soba and decided to save Dionísio & Petra and replaced them with Samupafo & Suraya.
 The nominations were divided into two rounds: the first one was on Sunday, in which each housemate nominated a pair and the second one was on Monday, in which each pair nominated another pair. The results were added, and Aníbal & Marinela, Dionísio & Petra and Samupafo & Suraya were the initial nominees. Then Luna & Mr. Norway won the Soba and decided to save Samupafo & Suraya and replaced them with Li.G & Timino.
 The nominations were divided into two rounds: the first one was on Sunday, in which each housemate nominated a pair and the second one was on Monday, in which each pair nominated another pair. The results were added, and Aníbal & Marinela, Cremilda & Filipe, Luna & Mr. Norway and Samupafo & Suraya were the initial nominees. Then Aníbal & Marinela won the Soba and were automatically saved. They then decided to save Cremilda & Filipe and replaced them with Alicelma & Fanto+.
 The nominations were divided into two rounds: the first one was on Sunday, in which each housemate nominated a pair and the second one was on Monday, in which each pair nominated another pair. The results were added, and Aníbal & Marinela, Ananias & Rossana, Cremilda & Filipe and Luna & Mr. Norway were the initial nominees. Then Aníbal & Marinela won the Soba and were automatically saved. They then decided to save Cremilda & Filipe and replaced them with Alicelma & Fanto+. However, Alicelma & Fanto+ had won a Power of Veto and decided to use it to save themselves. For their replacements, they decided to nominate Cremilda & Filipe, being kept the initial nominees.
 Since Aníbal & Marinela were the Sobas and were ejected, a new competition was held and Li.G & Timino won it, therefore are the Sobas for the rest of the week.
 This week was the "Crazy Week", in which everything that happened was fake. Luna & Mr. Norway were fake evicted on the live show and only returned to the house on Tuesday, missing the nominations. The nominations were divided into two rounds: the first one was on Sunday, in which each housemate nominated a pair and the second one was on Monday, in which each pair nominated another pair. The results were added, and Alicelma & Fanto+ and Ananias & Rossana were initially nominated. Then Alicelma & Fanto+ won the Soba and were automatically saved. This made Li.G & Timino the only pair eligible to go up, so they did. However, these were fake nominations and no-one was evicted this week.
 The nominations were divided into two rounds: the first one was on Sunday, in which each housemate nominated a pair and the second one was on Monday, in which each pair nominated another pair. The results were added, and Li.G & Timino and Luna & Mr. Norway were the initial nominees. Then Ananias & Rossana won the Soba, winning a place in the finale. They decided to not save one of the nominees, which means Alicelma & Fanto+ were the second pair declared as finalists.

External links 
 Official Site

Angola
2015 Angolan television seasons